Marcelo Cano Rodríguez is a Cuban physician and a member of the Comisión Cubana de Derechos Humanos y Reconciliación Nacional (CCDHRN, English: Cuban Commission for Human Rights and National Reconciliation).

Marcelo Cano Rodríguez was imprisoned during the Black Spring crackdown on dissidents in 2003.

References

Cuban physicians
Cuban dissidents
Living people
Year of birth missing (living people)